Cricotopus is a genus of non-biting midges in the subfamily Orthocladiinae of the bloodworm family Chironomidae.

Species
C. annulator Goetghebuer, 1927
C. arcuatus Hirvenoja, 1973
C. beckeri Hirvenoja, 1973
C. bicinctus (Meigen, 1818)
C. brevipalpis Kieffer, 1909
C. caducus Hirvenoja, 1973
C. coronatus Hirvenoja, 1973
C. cumulatus Hirvenoja, 1973
C. curtus Hirvenoja, 1973
C. cylindraceus (Kieffer, 1908)
C. debilis (Williston, 1896)
C. dobroginus Albu, 1964
C. elegans Johannsen, 1943
C. ephippium (Zetterstedt, 1838)
C. festivellus (Kieffer, 1906)
C. flavocinctus (Kieffer, 1924)
C. fuscus (Kieffer, 1909)
C. gelidus (Kieffer, 1922)
C. glacialis Edwards, 1922
C. guttatus Hirvenoja, 1973
C. intersectus (Staeger, 1839)
C. laetus Hirvenoja, 1973
C. laricomalis Edwards, 1932
C. lestralis (Edwards, 1924)
C. levantinus Moubayed & Hirvenoja, 1986
C. lygropis Edwards, 1929
C. magus Hirvenoja, 1973
C. maurii Spies & Sæther, 2004
C. nevadensis Casas & Vilchez-Quero, 1992
C. obnixus (Walker, 1856)
C. obtusus Hirvenoja, 1973
C. ornatus (Meigen, 1818)
C. pallidipes Edwards, 1929
C. patens Hirvenoja, 1973
C. perniger (Zetterstedt, 1850)
C. pilicauda Hirvenoja, 1973
C. pilidorsum Hirvenoja, 1973
C. pilitarsis (Zetterstedt, 1850)
C. pilosellus Brundin, 1956
C. pirifer Hirvenoja, 1973
C. polaris Kieffer, 1926
C. pulchripes Verrall, 1912
C. reductus Hirvenoja, 1973
C. relucens Hirvenoja, 1973
C. reversus Hirvenoja, 1973
C. septentrionalis Hirvenoja, 1973
C. similis Goetghebuer, 1921
C. slossonae Malloch, 1915
C. speciosus Goetghebuer, 1921
C. suspiciosus Hirvenoja, 1973
C. sylvestris (Fabricius, 1794)
C. tibialis (Meigen, 1804)
C. tremulus (Linnaeus, 1758)
C. triannulatus (Macquart, 1826)
C. tricinctus (Meigen, 1818)
C. trifascia Edwards, 1929
C. trifasciatus (Meigen, 1810)
C. tristis Hirvenoja, 1973
C. vierriensis Goetghebuer, 1935
C. villosus Hirvenoja, 1973
C. zavreli Szadziewski & Hirvenoja, 1981

References 

 Revision der gattung Cricotopus van der Wulp und ihrer Verwandten (Diptera, Chironomidae). M Hirvenoja, 1973

External links 
 Cricotopus at insectoid.info

Chironomidae
Culicomorpha genera